Akula Rajender (born 1959) is an Indian politician belonging to Indian National Congress. He is a Member of Legislative Assembly from Malkajgiri, Andhra Pradesh.

Career
Akula Rajender was elected to Andhra Pradesh Legislative Assembly in 2009.

References

Indian National Congress politicians from Andhra Pradesh
Living people
1978 births